A succession crisis is a crisis that arises when an order of succession fails, for example when a king dies without an indisputable heir. It may result in a war of succession.

Examples include (see List of wars of succession):
The Wars of The Roses
1936 Abdication Of  Edward VIII (Marrying a Divorcee)
Multiple periods during the history of the Roman Empire:
Year of the Four Emperors (69 AD)
Year of the Five Emperors (193 AD)
Year of the Six Emperors (238 AD)
Bolesław I's intervention in the Kievan succession crisis
1383–1385 Crisis, the 1383–1385 succession crisis over the throne of Portugal
Portuguese succession crisis of 1580, the 1580 succession crisis over the throne of Portugal
1558–1559, English succession crisis after the death of Mary I of England
1598 Times of Troubles in Russia
The succession of Henry IV of France, which provoked persistent Catholic resistance with Spanish support and led to war with Spain in 1595
War of the Spanish Succession (1701–1714) over who would succeed Charles II of Spain
Monaco succession crisis of 1918, the 1918 succession crisis over the throne of Monaco
Succession crisis (Latter Day Saints), the 1844 leadership crisis in the Latter Day Saint movement after the death of Joseph Smith
The 1841 succession crisis in the United States following the death of William Henry Harrison, concerning whether his successor became President of the United States or merely assumed the powers of the office.
A Game of Thrones & Fire and Blood, novels that centre the plot around the repurcussions of kings dying and leaving disputable heirs. Both novels have been adapted to live-action series.

Political crisis
Succession